Hückel or Huckel may refer to:

 Erich Hückel (1896-1980), German physicist and chemist
 Debye–Hückel equation (named after  Peter Debye and Erich Hückel), in chemistry, a method of calculating activity coefficients
 Hückel method (named after Erich Hückel), a method for the determination of energies of molecular orbitals
 Extended Hückel method, considers also sigma orbitals (whereas the original Hückel method only considers pi orbitals)
 Hückel's rule (named after Erich Hückel), a method of determining aromaticity in organic molecules
  (1895-1973), German chemist
  (born 1936), German diplomat, Ambassador of the GDR in Chad